The first series of Love Sick The Series began on July 6, 2014 and ended on September 21, 2014.

The second series of Love Sick The Series began on May 2, 2015 and concluded on October 10, 2015.

Episodes 
To be updated as more information is revealed

Lists of Thai drama television series episodes